Paul Chester Kainen is an American mathematician, an adjunct associate professor of mathematics and director of the Lab for Visual Mathematics at Georgetown University. Kainen is the author of a popular book on the four color theorem, and is also known for his work on book embeddings of graphs.

Biography
Kainen received his Bachelor of Arts degree from George Washington University in 1966 and was awarded the Ruggles Prize for Excellence in Mathematics.  He went on to get his Ph.D. from Cornell University in 1970 with Peter Hilton as his thesis advisor. Kainen's father was the American artist Jacob Kainen.

Selected publications
. 2nd ed., Dover, 1986, .
.

References

External links
Home page at Georgetown
Paul Kainen's Page on Industrial Mathematics and BioPhotonics at Industrial Math

20th-century American mathematicians
21st-century American mathematicians
Graph theorists
Columbian College of Arts and Sciences alumni
Cornell University alumni
Georgetown University faculty
Living people
Year of birth missing (living people)